Coronation is a 2000 Chilean film directed by Silvio Caiozzi. It was Chile's submission to the 73rd Academy Awards for the Academy Award for Best Foreign Language Film, but it was not nominated.

Plot
The film tells the story of Andrés (Julio Jung), a man leading a boring and bourgeois life in a large mansion with his grandmother, Elisa de Ábalos (María Cánepa), an elderly woman who gradually loses touch with reality. The monotony of Andrés' life is disrupted when Estela (Adela Secall), a young and innocent villager, arrives at the mansion and immediately becomes the object of his attraction. This triggers an internal struggle within Andrés caused by his newfound feelings. Meanwhile, Estela falls in love with Mario (Paulo Meza), a humble welder from the neighborhood who happens to be the brother of a petty criminal. It is this latter character who sets off the final conflict of the film.

Cast
 María Cánepa - Elisa de Ábalos
 Julio Jung - Andrés Ábalos
  - Estela
 Myriam Palacios - Rosario
 Luis Dubó - René

References

External links

2000 films
2000 drama films
2000s Spanish-language films
Chilean drama films